The Sylvia M. Stoesser Lecture series was established in 2000 by the Department of Chemistry at the University of Illinois.  It is supported by alumna Yulan Tong and by Dow AgroSciences.  It is named after the first woman chemist to work at Dow, Sylvia M. Stoesser.  The lectureship is given every two years to "an individual who has made outstanding contributions to the chemical community and provides new perspectives in the chemical field outside academia."

Lecturers

References

Science awards honoring women